Abiad is a surname. Notable people with the surname include:

Fouad Abiad (born 1978), Canadian bodybuilder
Kate Peterson Abiad (born 1969), American basketball coach

See also
 Al-Ubaid (disambiguation) (includes Obeid and others)